The 5.6×57mm (designated as the 5,6 × 57 by the C.I.P.) cartridge was created by Rheinisch-Westfälische Sprengstoffwerke (RWS) in Germany in 1964 by necking down popular 7×57mm Mauser (similarly to how Paul Mauser himself created 6.5×57mm Mauser) for hunting small deer such as roe deer, and for chamois. The calibre has a significant following among European sportsmen, and most European mass production riflemakers chamber several models of rifle for this cartridge.  During the 1970-1990 period this cartridge was widely and successfully used in the Republic of Ireland for deer shooting, since security considerations at a period of Provisional Irish Republican Army violence had led to a ban on the civilian ownership of calibres larger than .224in.  Some British small deer specialist hunters use the 5.6×57 mm with great success on roe deer, muntjac and Chinese water deer.

The .223 Winchester Super Short Magnum is a 21st-century cartridge that is comparable to the 5.6×57 mm.

The 5.6×57mm cartridge case has a distinctively thick case wall, and this causes significant problems when handloading, owing to the force that needs to be used through the press when re-sizing the case neck.  It has been suggested that this unusual neck thickness is the result of the use of .22 rimfire chamber adapters in centrefire rifles chambered for this cartridge.

5.6×57mm rimmed variant
The 5.6×57mmR (designated as the 5,6 × 57 R by the C.I.P.) is a rimmed variant of the 5.6×57mm. The rimmed variant was designed for break-open rifles and is almost identical to the rimless variant except for the rim.

Specifications
 Bullet diameter: 5.69 mm (.224")
 Loads:
 74 gr @ 1040 m/s (3412 ft/s)
 60 gr @ 3700 ft/s

References

Pistol and rifle cartridges